Robbrechtia is a genus of flowering plants belonging to the family Rubiaceae.

It is native to Madagascar.

The genus name of Robbrechtia is in honour of Elmar Robbrecht (b. 1946), a Belgian botanist and mycologist at the national botanic gardens. He is also a specialist in Rubiaceae. It was first described and published in Syst. Bot. Vol.28 on page 146 in 2003.

Known species; according to Kew
 Robbrechtia grandifolia De Block 
 Robbrechtia milleri De Block

References

Rubiaceae
Rubiaceae genera
Plants described in 2003
Endemic flora of Madagascar